The women's marathon at the 2018 Commonwealth Games, as part of the athletics programme, was held in Southport Broadwater Parklands, Gold Coast on 15 April 2018.

Records
Prior to this competition, the existing world and Games records were as follows:

Schedule
The schedule was as follows:

All times are Australian Eastern Standard Time (UTC+10)

Results
The results were as follows:

References

Women's marathon
2018
2018 in women's athletics
Comm
2018 Commonwealth Games